Parergodrilus is a genus of annelids belonging to the family Parergodrilidae.

The species of this genus are found in Europe and Japan.

Species:
 Parergodrilus heideri Reisinger, 1925

References

Annelids